Kendy Tateishi Berbel (born 19 August 1997), commonly known as Kendy or Japa, is a Brazilian footballer who currently plays as a forward.

Career statistics

Club

Notes

References

1997 births
Living people
Brazilian footballers
Association football forwards
Associação Chapecoense de Futebol players
Clube Atlético Metropolitano players
Sportspeople from Mato Grosso do Sul